Toi is one of the fourteen villages of Niue, located north of the island, 17 km from Alofi,also located 2.40 km from the coast. Its population at the 2017 census was 22, down from 25 in 2011. There is a road that goes down to Hikutavake,which is the closest town to Toi.

References

Populated places in Niue